Crumbs protein homolog 3 is a protein that in humans is encoded by the CRB3 gene.

Function 

This gene encodes a member of the Crumbs family of proteins. This protein may play a role in epithelial cell polarity and is associated with tight junctions at the apical surface of epithelial cells. Alternate transcriptional splice variants, encoding different isoforms, have been characterized.

References

External links

Further reading